Daniel Orzechowski (born 1 June 1985) is a Brazilian swimmer who has competed at World and Olympic level.

At the 2006 South American Games, got the silver medal in the 100-metre backstroke, in the 4×100-metre medley, and bronze in the 50-metre backstroke.

At the 2010 South American Games, Daniel won the bronze medal in the 50-metre backstroke.

In April 2012, at the Maria Lenk Trophy, he broke the South American record of 50-metre backstroke, with the best time in the world at that stage of the year, 24.44 seconds.

He qualified for the 2012 Summer Olympics in London, in the 100-metre backstroke. Daniel finished in 28th place in the heats, failing to make the semi-finals.

At the 2012 FINA World Swimming Championships (25 m) in Istanbul, he reached the final of the 50-metre backstroke, placing 7th. He also ranked 18th in the 100-metre backstroke. Daniel also competed for the Brazilian 4×100-metre medley relay team, which qualified for the finals,  finishing in 4th place.

At the 2013 World Aquatics Championships in Barcelona, he finished 6th in the 50-metre backstroke final  and 21st in the 100-metre backstroke.

References

Brazilian male backstroke swimmers
Living people
Olympic swimmers of Brazil
Swimmers at the 2012 Summer Olympics
Brazilian people of Polish descent
1985 births
People from Joinville
South American Games silver medalists for Brazil
South American Games bronze medalists for Brazil
South American Games medalists in swimming
Competitors at the 2006 South American Games
Competitors at the 2010 South American Games
Sportspeople from Santa Catarina (state)
21st-century Brazilian people
20th-century Brazilian people